Proyecto Mirage, is an electronic music duo from Madrid.

Full Time Albums 

Proyecto Mirage, Hands Productions -1999
Two tons of Rubble, Hands Productions -2001
Two tons of Rubble-Box, (limited edition) Hands Productions -2001
Do not look at me -Picture Vinil (limited edition) -2002
Gas Alarm, Hands Productions -2004
Gimme Your Energy, Hands Productions -2006
Gas the DJ, Mindstrike Records -2006
Turn it on, Ant-Zen -2008

Compilations 

Waveland album, Waveland -1995, ES
Radar live act ..CD1 -1997, ES
Radar live act ..CD2 -1998, ES
Iberica Electronica, Brainwaves -1999, ES
Re-activated, Caustic Records, 1999, ES
Radar live act ..CD3 -1999, ES
Industrial Frecuencies vol 3, Orkus -2000, Ger
2000 Hands, Hands Productions -2000, Ger
Maschinenfest´00, Pflichtkauf -2000, Ger
Triton Compilation, Triton -2001, Ger
Laboratorio, Experimentaclub -2001, Es
Form of Hands, Hands Productions -2001, Ger
Maschinenfest´01, Pflichtkauf -2001, Ger
2001 Hands, Hands Productions -2001, Ger
Industrial Frecuencies vol 4, Orkus -2002, Ger
Ducasse, STKM -2002, Es
Form of Hands, Hands Productions -2003, Ger
Belio Compilation, Himen -2003, ES-GER
Against, Caustic Records -2003, ES
Tonal Destruction, DTA Records -2003, USA
Sonic Seducer (Cold Hands Seductions) -2003, Ger
Secuencie or die, Brainchaos -2003, Japan
Noise, Just do it, Invasion Wreck Chords -2004, Belarus
The Nein Raid, Nein Records -2004, USA
Maschinenfest´04, Pflichtkauf -2004, Ger
Fuckktop lp, Mindstrike -2005, Es
Wildcat ..72 - magazine- January 2005, Ger
2005 Hands, Hands Productions -2005, Ger
Form of Hands, Hands Productions -2005, Ger
Homenaje, Rackham records -2005, Es
The Scariest Weapon:3 -2005, Invasion Wreck Chords -2005, Belarus
Pandora's box - invasion and friends -2006, Invasion Wreck Chords -2006, Belarus
New Input Noise -2006, HellektroEmpire-2006, Italy
F** The Mainstream, Vampire Freaks / Alfa Matrix-2007, Belgium
Cut&Go, Invasion Wreck Chords-2007, Belarus
Caution! Invasion & Friends 2k7, Invasion Wreck Chords -2007 (DVD), Belarus
Tanzfront Compilation, Tanzfront -2008, Russia
Maschinenfest Compilation, Pflichtkauf-2008,Ger

Mixes 

Spate liebe, W.v. Zorn -2002, Austria
Belarus Teenage Action, Ambassador 21, -2003, Belarus
Scraped X, DTA -2003, USA
Philomenescus Cerverus, Epidemia -2003, USA
Trip Suspended, Matka, Spain -2003
Magic Drop, Dj Mauri -2004, Spain
Domination, Aseptic room, -2004, Spain
we declare Revolution, Ambassador 21, -2004, Belarus
Squelch Mc Arra Remix, Prometheus Burning, -2007, USA
Nuclear Device, Ctrler, -2007 Spain

Other projects 

PLACID
Skull of a pussy. CD full-time, Hands Productions -2002, Ger
Don't fuck with us, compilation, Digital Hardcore - 2002, USA
Maschinenfest´02, compilation, Maschinenfest - 2002, GER
2003 Hands, compilation, Hands Productions - 2003, GER
Form of Hands, Hands Productions - 2003, GER
Von der Friedhof-Allee, Zoomica Music - 2003, GER
Industrial Highlights 01, Zoomica Music - 2003, GER

BUBBLE GUM
She is Dancig..., 7´ Vinil, Bazooka-joe - 2002, Ger
Hidden addictions, CD, STKM - 2003, Es
Bershka, (compilation), El Diablo - 2003, Es
ElectroSpain(compilation), Subterfuge - 2004, Es

Sources: 
Official web / Francisco Planellas / http://www.ant-zen.com/act/act215.htm

Spanish industrial music groups
Noise musical groups